Acceptance, Test Or Launch Language (ATOLL) was the programming language used for automating the checking and launch of  Saturn rockets.

References

Saturn (rocket family)
Avionics programming languages